Leninskaya is a station on the Avtozavodskaya line of the Nizhny Novgorod Metro. The station opened on 20 November 1985 and was one of six initial stations of the Metro.

The station is located at Leninsky district of Nizhny Novgorod on the northern end of Prospekt Lenina where the road begins.

References

External links
Station page on official Metro website

Nizhny Novgorod Metro stations
Railway stations in Russia opened in 1985
1985 establishments in the Soviet Union
Railway stations located underground in Russia